Pythonides is a genus of skippers.

Species
Recognised species include:
 Pythonides amaryllis Staudinger, 1876
 Pythonides jovianus Stoll, 1782
 Pythonides lancea Hewitson, 1868
 Pythonides lerina Hewitson, 1868

References

Pyrginae
Hesperiidae genera
Taxa named by Jacob Hübner